Arróniz is a town and municipality located in the province and autonomous community of Navarre, northern Spain.

References

External links
 
 ARRONIZ in the Bernardo Estornés Lasa - Auñamendi Encyclopedia (Euskomedia Fundazioa) 
 Official web of the town 

Municipalities in Navarre